Bassingfield is a hamlet in Nottinghamshire, England. It is in the civil parish of Holme Pierrepont.

External links
 
 

Hamlets in Nottinghamshire
Rushcliffe